Gâlma River may refer to:

 Gâlma, a tributary of the Ialomicioara in Dâmbovița County
 Gâlma, a tributary of the Ialomița in Dâmbovița County